Thomas Rhodin (born April 8, 1971) is a Swedish former professional ice hockey defenceman

Career 
Rhodin started his career with Färjestad BK in 1989 and has played a total of twelve seasons with them. He has also played with the German club Eisbären Berlin between 1997 and 2000 and with the Nationalliga A teams HC Fribourg-Gottéron (2003–05) and Genève-Servette HC (2005). In 2002, 2003 and 2005, he represented Sweden at the Ice Hockey World Championship. Before the start of the 2005/06, he was offered a contract by NHL club Dallas Stars, but turned it down. Instead, he signed with Färjestad, here was named as alternate captain and was than released on 9 April 2009, later on 8 May 2009 signed with Skåre BK. On 5 September 2009 it was announced that he had signed with Leksands IF. Thereby he opted to use a clause in his contract with Skåre BK which allowed him to sign with a team from a higher division.

Career statistics

Regular season and playoffs

International

References

1971 births
Living people
Sportspeople from Karlstad
Eisbären Berlin players
Färjestad BK players
Genève-Servette HC players
HC Fribourg-Gottéron players
Leksands IF players
Swedish ice hockey defencemen
Swedish expatriate ice hockey players in Germany
Swedish expatriate sportspeople in Switzerland